Trevor Leonard Strong (born 26 February 1961) is a former Australian politician. He was a Labor member of the Legislative Assembly of Queensland from 2001 to 2004, representing the seat of Burnett.

Strong was a qualified carpenter before entering parliament, and is married with four children. He was previously President of the Moore Park Branch of the ALP. He was elected to the seat of Burnett in Labor's landslide win in 2001, but was defeated at the next election in 2004. He has not returned to politics.

References

1961 births
Living people
Members of the Queensland Legislative Assembly
Australian Labor Party members of the Parliament of Queensland
21st-century Australian politicians